The Public Prosecutor General at the Federal Court of Justice ( or Generalbundesanwältin beim Bundesgerichtshof (GBA), lit.: "General Federal Attorney at the Federal Court of Justice") is the federal prosecutor of Germany, representing the federal government at the Bundesgerichtshof, the federal court of justice. The office of the Public Prosecutor General is located in Karlsruhe. Besides its role in appellate cases, the Public Prosecutor General has primary jurisdiction in cases of crimes against the state (in particular terrorism, espionage and treason), and offences under the Völkerstrafgesetzbuch (genocide, crimes against humanity and war crimes). The Public Prosecutor General also represents Germany in certain civil and administrative cases.

The Federal Minister of Justice proposes the Public Prosecutor General with the approval of the Bundesrat to the President of Germany for appointment. The Public Prosecutor General is considered a political official. He is supposed to share the criminal and security policy views and objectives of the respective acting federal government and can be recalled without outspoken reasons at any time. He is subject to the supervision of the Federal Minister of Justice.

In 1977, then-Public Prosecutor General Siegfried Buback was assassinated by an extremist left-wing group, the Red Army Faction.

Location, premises
From 1950 until 1998, the office of the Public Prosecutor General shared a building in Karlsruhe with the Bundesgerichtshof (Federal Court of Justice). Since then it is in a new building on the site of the former "Deutsche Waffen- und Munitionsfabrik" [German arms and munitions factory], now the Zentrum für Kunst und Medientechnologie (ZKM), designed by Oswald Mathias Ungers.

Organization 
The GBA is supported by a Deputy Public Prosecutor General at the Federal Court of Justice (Stellvertretender Generalbundesanwalt beim Bundesgerichtshof) and several Federal Prosecutors at the Federal Court of Justice (Bundesanwälte beim Bundesgerichtshof), Senior Public Prosecutors at the Federal Court of Justice (Oberstaatsanwälte beim Bundesgerichtshof) and Public Prosecutors at the Federal Court of Justice (Staatsanwälte beim Bundesgerichtshof). He has a staff of about 300, of whom about 110 are permanently assigned public prosecutors and about 50 public prosecutors or judges from the federal states, who are usually seconded for three years. 

The office of the Public Prosecutor General at the Federal Court of Justice is organized as follows:

 Directorate ZS: central services (5 departments); espionage; crimes under the Foreign Trade and Payments Act, crimes under the War Weapons Control Act, international criminal law (5 departments)
 Directorate Appeals: appeals at the Federal Court of Justice (7 departments)
 Directorate TE: terrorism (11 departments)

List of Public Prosecutors General since 1950

References

External links

 
Judiciary of Germany
1950 establishments in Germany
Organisations based in Karlsruhe